Ballygunge Circular Road which was renamed as Promotesh Barua Sarani , after the legendary actor and doyen of Bengali Cinema, is one of the most important roads which runs through the upscale part of Ballygunge in South Kolkata. It starts near the Ballygunge Science College right off Gariahat Road, passing through landmarks like Tripura House, St Lawrence High School etc. before  meeting Gurusaday Dutta Road about a mile up the road. It then finally meets AJC Bose Road a bit further up. A large military camp (known as Ballygunge Maidan Camp) is located on the North-Western stretch of the road, starting right after the David Hare Training College and ending at the intersection of Chakraberia Road.

Localities

It is surrounded by nice residential houses in the vicinity of Tripura House, mainly in the stretch between the Science College and St. Lawrence High School. Some of the finest residential apartments as well as posh villas dot this road. Many prominent residential spots like "Vedant Apartments", on the plot that used to house legendary Bengali actress Suchitra Sen’s bungalow, have sprung up recently. "Devadwar" at 34 Ballygunge Circular Road is considered to be one of the best residential buildings in the city. Other notable plush high rise apartments include "Paramount", "Uttarayan", "Aishwarya" ,"Le Palmerie", "The Residency", "Tripura Enclave", "Surya", "Balaka", "Tivoli Court" and the upcoming Sky villas "Shiromani" and "Sri Avani". Ballygunge Circular Road is surrounded by other upscale and posh areas of Ballygunge like Gurusaday Dutta Road, Rainey Park, Rowland Road, Lovelock Street, Ritchie Road, Dover Road, Dover Park, and Queens Park.
There are other landmarks such as the Max Mueller Bhavan (Goethe Institute), (which has now shifted to Park Mansions) "Miranda Hall" — one of the most exclusive Montessori schools in Kolkata was also situated on this road.

Landmarks

 Department of Jute & Fibre Technology, Institute of Jute Technology, C.U.
 Ballygunge Science College
 Surya Apartments
 Naba Kailash Apartments
 Calcutta Cosmopolitan Club
 Devadwar
 Tripura Enclave
 Tripura House
 Santosh Estate
 St Lawrence High School
 David Hare Training College
 Paramount
 Le Palmerie
 Ballygunge Maidan Camp
 Calcutta Punjab Club
 Kendriya Vidyalaya 
 Automobile Association of Eastern India Club
 Rainey Park Residency
 Tivoli Court
 Sona Villa (estd 1901) 
 Balaka
Heritage property on 53 Ballygunge Circular Road

Notable residents

 Suchitra Sen – Actress and mother of actress Moon Moon Sen and grandmother of Riya Sen and Raima Sen.
 Aditya Vikram Sengupta – National Award Winning Filmmaker (Asha Jaoar Majhe), Cinematographer and Artist
Ashwika Kapur – India's ONLY girl GREEN OSCAR Winner in a Global Category and the youngest Girl Winner in the world.
Indrani Sen – An exponent of Rabindrasangeet and Nazrulgeeti a professor of Bagbazar women's college.

Restaurants
 Chatar Patar
 Red Hot Chili Pepper 
 Sanjha Chulha
 Ganges
 24 hr Cafe Coffee Day
 Mama mia Gelato
 Azad Hind Dhaba
Sharma Dhaba

See also
 Park Street
 Camac Street
 Sudder Street

References

Roads in Kolkata
Neighbourhoods in Kolkata